The 2015 Tulane Green Wave football team represented Tulane University in the 2015 NCAA Division I FBS football season. They were led by fourth-year head coach Curtis Johnson and played home games at Yulman Stadium. They were members of the Western Division of the American Athletic Conference. They finished the season 3–9, 1–7 in American Athletic play to finish in a tie for fifth place.

On November 28, head coach Curtis Johnson was fired. He finished at Tulane with a four-year record of 15–34.

Before the season

Recruits

Award watch lists
Chris Taylor
 Outland Trophy
 Lombardi Award
Parry Nickerson
 Jim Thorpe Award
Royce LaFrance
 Lombardi Award
Nico Marley
 Lombardi Award

Roster

Schedule

Source

Game summaries

Duke

Georgia Tech

Maine

UCF

In this game, Tulane long snapper Aaron Golub became the first legally blind person to play in an NCAA division I game.

Temple

Houston

Navy

Memphis

UConn

Army

SMU

Tulsa

Led by former walk-on and fifth-year senior Jordy Joseph due to an injury to starting Quarterback Tanner Lee, Tulane led Tulsa by 10 points well into the fourth quarter. Joseph then threw two interceptions, both of which were returned for touchdowns. Following the Green Wave's loss, capping a 3–9 season, head coach Curtis Johnson was fired. His final record in four years with the program was 15–34. In Tulane's press release, Athletic Director Rick Dickson was quoted as saying "...the program has not progressed to the level that we aspire to."

References

Tulane
Tulane Green Wave football seasons
Tulane Green Wave football